Newbold-on-Avon Rugby Club is an English rugby union club based in Newbold-on-Avon, Warwickshire. The first XV team currently plays in Midlands 1 West.

Club honours
Midland Counties Cup winners: 1925–26
Midlands West 1 champions: 1997–98
Midlands 2 West (South) champions: 2014–15
Midlands 1 East champions: 2016–17

Notes

References

External links
 Official club website

English rugby union teams
Rugby union in Warwickshire
Sports clubs in England